This is a bibliography of the U.S. State of Colorado.


General history

Sibley, George. Water Wranglers - The 75-Year History of the Colorado River District: A Story About the Embattled Colorado River and the Growth of the West. Grand Junction, Colorado, U.S.: Colorado River District.  Copyright and first printing, September 13, 2012, George Sibley and Colorado River District.

Agriculture and livestock

Colorado State Grange. Colorado State Grange History: 1874–1975. Westminster, CO: North Suburban Printing & Publishing Incorporated, 1975.

Dobie, Frank J. Cow People. Austin: University of Texas Press, 1964.

Easterly, Lewis H. The Agricultural and livestock Interest of Gunnison County. Gunnison City, Colorado: 1916.

Frink, Maurice. When Grass was King. Denver: University of Colorado Press, 1956.

Goff, Richard. Century in the Saddle. Denver: Colorado Cattlemen's Centennial Commission, 1967.

Goff, Richard, Robert McCaffree, and Doris Sterbenz. Centennial Brand Book. Denver: Colorado Cattlemen’s Centennial Commission, Denver, Colorado, 1967.

Goff, Richard, Robert McCaffree. Century in the Saddle. Boulder: Johnson Publishing Company, 1967.

Hall, Frank Louis. "Structural Changes in Colorado’s Agriculture". Fort Collins, Colorado: Colorado State University, 1971.

Marriott, Alice. Hell on Horses and Women. Norman and London: University of Oklahoma Press, 1953.

McCann, Roud. Colorado’s Agriculture. Fort Collins, Colorado: Colorado Agricultural College, Extension Service, 1925.

Meyers, Sandra L. Westering Women. Albuquerque: University of New Mexico Press, 1982.

Mumey, Nolie, ed. The Westerners Brand Book. 
First Forest Ranger – Len Shoemaker. Denver: Denver Possee, V0l. VII, 1951.

Osgood, Ernest. The Day of the Cattleman. Chicago: University of Chicago Press, 1929.

Peake, Ora Brooks. The Colorado Range Cattle Industry. Glendale, California: The Arthur H. Clark Company, 1937.

Sammons, Judy Buffington. Tall Grass and Good Cattle: A Century of Ranching in the Gunnison Country. 3rd Ed. Gunnison: Dove Graphics, Western State College Foundation, Inc.

Shores, C. W. Memoirs of a Law Man. Ed. Wilson Rockwell. Denver: Saga Books, 1962.

Shores, C. W. The Cooperative Century. Boulder: Johnson Publishing Company, 1967. The Colorado Cattlemen’s Centennial Commission.

Smith, P. David, and Lyn Bezek. On the Backs of Burros: Bringing Civilization to Colorado. Lake City, CO: Western Reflections Publishing Company, 2010.

Steinel, Alvin Theodore. History of Agriculture in Colorado. Fort Collins, Colorado: The State Agricultural College, 1926.

Wallace, Betty. Gunnison Country. Denver: Sage Books, 1960.

Wallace, Betty. History with the Hide Off. Denver: Sage Books, 1964.

Wolfenstine, Manfred R. The Manual of Brands and Marks. Ed. Ramon F. Adams. Norman: University of Oklahoma Press, 1970.

Journals, associations and organizations
Gunnison County Stockgrower’s Association, 1894 – 1994. U.S.A.: GCSA, 1994. Leslie J. Savage Library, Call number: SF196 C6 G8 1994.
Fogg, H. H. The First Decade of the Gunnison Stockgrower’s Association: Personalities and Trends,. Gunnison, Colorado: In possession of the Gunnison Stockgrower’s Association. 1894 – 1904.
Gunnison County Stockgrower’s Association Since 1894,.  75th Anniversary Issue: pre-print from The Cattle Guard, August 1967.

Federal documents
Gunnison County Abstract of Assessment and Levies, 1915 – 1922,. Located in the Gunnison County Courthouse, (The Blackstock Building).
The Federal Range Code, (commonly known as "The Taylor Grazing Act", under the "Act of June 28, 1934, as amended by the Act of June 26, 1936").
Ker, Bill. Gunnison National Forest: a Brief History. USFS: Gunnison Field Office, undated.
Colorado Senate Journal 15th Day, Jan. 21, 1976.
Range Rider Newsletter Nov. 2, 1993. Publication of Gunnison Soil Conservation District.

Architecture

Dallas, Sandra. No More Than Five in a Bed: Colorado Hotels in the Old Days. Norman, Oklahoma: University of Oklahoma Press, 1967.

Jackson, Olga. Architecture/Colorado. Denver, Colorado: American Institute of Architects, Colorado Chapter, 1966.

Noel, Thomas Jacob. Buildings of Colorado. New York : Oxford University Press, 1997.

Education

Rockwell, Noraetta, The Early History of Gunnison County, Colorado Schools. Unpublished Master’s Thesis, WSC, 1953.

Forest Service
Shoemaker, Len. Saga of a Forest Ranger. Boulder: University of Colorado Press, 1958.

Geology

Bueler, William M. Roof of the Rockies: A History of Mountaineering in Colorado. Boulder, Colorado: Pruett Publishing Company, 1974.

Chronic, John. Prairie, Peak, and Plateau : A Guide to the Geology of Colorado. Denver, Colorado: Colorado Geological Survey, 1972.

Weimer, Robert J. and Haun. John D. ed. Guide to the Geology of Colorado. Denver, Colorado: Geological Society of America, Rocky Mountain Association of Geologists & Colorado Scientific Society, 1960.

Government

Lamm, Richard D. Pioneers & Politicians: 10 Colorado Governors in Profile. Boulder, Co.: Pruett Publishing Company, 1984.

Lindbloom, Harold Seth. Colorado Citizen. Denver, Colorado: Old West Publishing Company, 1966.

Martin, Curtis. Colorado Government and Politics. Boulder, Colorado: Pruett Press, 1964.

Waton, Rodger Alan. Colorado: A Practical Guide to its Government and Politics. Fort Collins, Colorado: Shields Publishing Company, 1973.

Military

Brandes, T. Donald. Military Posts of Colorado. Fort Collins, Colorado: Old Army Press, 1973.

Nankivell, John H. History of the Military Organizations of the State of Colorado: 1860 – 1935. Denver, Colorado: W. H. Kistler Stationery Company, 1935.

Mining and industry

Able, Mary Prentiss. Mines and Mills of Colorado. Denver, Colorado: The Author, 1976.

Dempsey, Stanley, and James E. Fell, Jr. Mining the Summit: Colorado's Ten Mile District, 1860-1960. University of Oklahoma Press, 1986.

Dorset, Phyllis. The New Eldorado: The Story of Colorado’s Gold and Silver Rushes. New York: Macmillan, 1970.

Henderson, Charles William. Mining in Colorado; A History of Discovery, Development and Production. Washington D. C., Government Printing Office, 1926.

Hollister, Ovando James. The Mines of Colorado. New York, Arno Press, [c1867]1973.

King, Joseph E. A Mine to Make a Mine: Financing the Colorado Mining Industry, 1859-1902. Texas A&M University Press, 1977.

Nelson, A. P. Gunnison County, Colorado. Pitkin, Colorado: A. P. Nelson Mining, 1916. P. 47.

Nossaman, Allen. Many More Mountains: An Illustrated History of the Earliest Exploration in the High San Juans of Southwestern Colorado and the Settlement and Founding of Silverton, Colorado. Denver, Colo.: Sundance Publications, 1989.

Smith, Duane A. Colorado Mining: A Photographic History. Albuquerque, New Mexico: University of New Mexico Press, 1977.

Smith, Duane A. The Trail of Gold and Silver: Mining in Colorado, 1859-2009. Boulder, CO: University Press of Colorado, 2009.

Southworth, Dave. Colorado Mining Camps. Round Rock, Texas: Wild Horse Publishing, 1997.

Wolle, Muriel Sibell. Stampede to Timberline: The Ghost Towns and Mining Camps of Colorado. Chicago, Illinois: Swallow Press, 1974.

Native Americans

Coel, Margaret. Chief Left Hand: Southern Arapaho. Norman: University of Oklahoma Press, 1981.

Hafen, Le Roy Reuben. The Indians of Colorado. Denver, Colorado: State Historical Society of Colorado, 1952.

Hughes, Johnson Donald. American Indians in Colorado. Boulder, Colorado: Pruett Publishing Company, 1977.

Marsh, Charles S. The Utes of Colorado – People of the Shining Mountains. Boulder, Colorado: Pruett Publishing Company, 1982.  (pbk).

Marsh, Charles Seabrooke. People of the Shining Mountains: The Utes of Colorado. Boulder, Colorado: Pruett Publishing Company, 1982.

Parkhill, Forbes. The Blazed Trail of Antoine Leroux. Los Angeles: Westernlore Press, 1965.

Smead, Cophine. Relations with the Plains Indians of Colorado, 1859 – 1869. Denver, Colorado: University of Colorado, 1947.

Young, Richard Keith. The Ute Indians of Colorado in the Twentieth Century. Norman, Oklahoma: University of Oklahoma Press. 1997.

Magazine Articles
Jackson, William H. "A Visit to the Los Pinos Indian Reservation." The Colorado Magazine, XV, Nov. 1938, pp. 201 – 209.

Borland, Lois. "Ho For the Reservation: Settlement of the Western Slope." The Colorado Magazine, XXIX, Jan. 1952, pp. 56 – 75.

Vader, Diane. "Mr. Outcalt and the Indians." Gunnison Country Magazine, Gunnison: B & B Printers, 1976.

Transportation

Beebe, Lucius Morris. Narrow Gauge in the Rockies. Berkeley, California: Howell-North, 1958.

Dines, Glen. Overland Stage: The Story of the Famous Overland Stagecoaches of the 1860s. New York: MacMillan, 1961.

Everett, George G. The Cavalcade of Railroads in Central Colorado. Denver: Golden Bell Press, 1966.

Feitz, Leland. Colorado Trolleys. Golden, Colorado: Bell Press, 1971.

Jessen, Kenneth. Railroads of Northern Colorado. Boulder, CO: Pruett Pub. Co., 1982.

LeMassena, Robert A. Colorado’s Mountain Railroads. Golden, Colorado: Smoking Stack Press, 1963 – 1968.

Ormes, Robert M. Railroads and the Rockies: A Record of Lines In and Near Colorado. Denver, Colorado: Sage Books, 1963.

Smith, P. David, and Lyn Bezek. On the Backs of Burros: Bringing Civilization to Colorado. Lake City, CO: Western Reflections Publishing Company, 2010.

Stocking, Hobart E. The Road to Santa Fe. New York: Hastings House, 1971.

Walker, Henry Pickering. The Rise and Decline of High Plains Wagon Freighting, 1822–1880. Boulder, Colorado: University of Colorado, 1965.

Wiatrowski, Claude A. Railroads of Colorado: Your Guide to Colorado's Historic Trains and Railway Sites. Stillwater, MN: Voyager Press, 2002.

See also

Colorado
Outline of Colorado
Index of Colorado-related articles
Bibliography of Colorado
Climate change in Colorado
Colorado statistical areas
Front Range Urban Corridor
North Central Colorado Urban Area
South Central Colorado Urban Area
Geography of Colorado
Geology of Colorado
History of Colorado
List of territorial claims and designations in Colorado
National Register of Historic Places listings in Colorado
Prehistory of Colorado
Timeline of Colorado history
List of cities and towns in Colorado
List of adjectivals and demonyms for Colorado cities
List of census-designated places in Colorado
List of city nicknames in Colorado
List of Colorado municipalities by county
Commons:Category:Cities in Colorado
List of counties in Colorado
Commons:Category:Counties of Colorado
List of forts in Colorado
List of ghost towns in Colorado
List of places in Colorado
Paleontology in Colorado

External links

 Colorado state government website
 Colorado Department of Transportation
 Colorado highway maps
 Colorado Travel Map
 Colorado counties
 Colorado municipalities
 Colorado special districts
 Colorado tourism
 List of searchable databases produced by Colorado state agencies hosted by the American Library Association Government Documents Roundtable.

Colorado
Colorado